Ricardo Alonso González Fonseca  (born 6 March 1974) is a Costa Rican former professional football goalkeeper who last played for Belén in the Primera División de Costa Rica.

Club career
Nicknamed el Gallinazo, González was relegated with Sagrada Familia after the 1994-95 season and then played for Carmelita and Alajuelense for whom he kept a record successive clean sheets, totalling 758 minutes in the 2002 season. He played 178 league games for Liga. He moved abroad to play alongside compatriot Rolando Fonseca for Comunicaciones of Guatemala in summer 2005 before joining Herediano in 2007.

He was lured away to join coach Paulo Wanchope at second division Uruguay de Coronado ahead of the 2011 Verano season. He moved to Belén ahead of the 2014 Verano season.

International career
González made his debut for Costa Rica in a friendly against Jamaica on September 27, 1995 and has made 44 appearances for the Costa Rica national football team, including three qualifying matches for the 2006 FIFA World Cup and five qualifying matches for the 2010 FIFA World Cup.

González made one appearance at the Copa América 2001 and four appearances at the Copa América 2004 He also made four appearances at the 2003 CONCACAF Gold Cup and two at the 2009 CONCACAF Gold Cup.

His final international was a September 2009 FIFA World Cup qualification match against El Salvador.

Personal life
He is married to Hazel Houdelath and they have four children: Karolina, Gabriel, Fabianna and Ivana.

References

External links
 
 World Cup 2002 profile - Nación 
 Profile at Nacion.com 

1974 births
Living people
Footballers from San José, Costa Rica
Association football goalkeepers
Costa Rican footballers
Costa Rica international footballers
Liga FPD players
1997 Copa América players
2001 UNCAF Nations Cup players
2001 Copa América players
2003 UNCAF Nations Cup players
2003 CONCACAF Gold Cup players
2004 Copa América players
2009 UNCAF Nations Cup players
2009 CONCACAF Gold Cup players
A.D. Carmelita footballers
L.D. Alajuelense footballers
Comunicaciones F.C. players
C.S. Herediano footballers
Belén F.C. players
Costa Rican expatriate footballers
Expatriate footballers in Guatemala
Copa Centroamericana-winning players
Central American Games gold medalists for Costa Rica
Central American Games medalists in football
1998 CONCACAF Gold Cup players